Cole Harbour is the name for a natural harbour located in the Canadian province of Nova Scotia.

It is located in central Halifax County, with the mouth of the harbour located 6 kilometres northeast of Halifax Harbour.

The entrance to Cole Harbour is protected by Rainbow Haven Beach, a barrier beach which forms a lagoon on the inland side.

Measuring approximately 4 kilometres east to west and 3 kilometres north to south, the harbour is shallow and rocky.  Virtually the entire shoreline and the harbour itself are protected by the provincial government as the Cole Harbour - Lawrencetown Coastal Heritage Provincial Park.

The centre of the harbour is divided by a man-made feature; during the late 19th century a railway was constructed from Dartmouth to Musquodoboit Harbour and crossed the width of Cole Harbour on a 3 kilometre causeway.  Rail service was abandoned by CN Rail during the 1980s and the corridor has been converted to a rail trail as part of the Trans Canada Trail.

Part of the western shore of Cole Harbour was dyked during the 19th century to provide land for farmers.  These structures were destroyed in the early 20th century and are now occupied by several residential homes along the Cow Bay road.

Communities
Communities along the shores of Cole Harbour from west to east include:

 Cow Bay
 Cole Harbour
 Upper Lawrencetown
 West Lawrencetown
 Naugle

Geography of Halifax, Nova Scotia
Ports and harbours of Nova Scotia